The Samsung Galaxy M33 5G is an Android-based smartphone produced by Samsung. This phone announced on 04 March 2022.

References 

Android (operating system) devices
Samsung smartphones
Mobile phones introduced in 2022
Samsung Galaxy
Mobile phones with multiple rear cameras